Market Drayton is a town and a civil parish in Shropshire, England.  It contains 80 listed buildings that are recorded in the National Heritage List for England.  Of these, four are at Grade II*, the middle of the three grades, and the others are at Grade II, the lowest grade.  Most of the listed buildings are grouped around the town centre, and many of them are houses, shops or public houses that are timber framed, or have a timber-framed core.  Other types of listed buildings include churches, memorials and other structures in a churchyard, restaurants and cafés, hotels, a former grammar school and schoolmaster's house, mills, bridges, a war memorial, and a pillbox.
 

Key

Buildings

References

Citations

Sources

Lists of buildings and structures in Shropshire
Listed